Beallsville is a borough in Washington County, Pennsylvania, United States and part of the Pittsburgh metropolitan area since 1950. The population was 392 at the 2020 census.  Much of the borough has been designated the Beallsville Historic District.

History
A post office called Beallsville has been in operation since 1822. Beallsville was named for Zephaniah Bealle, a pioneer settler. The borough was incorporated in 1852.

Geography
Beallsville is located at  (40.064608, -80.024814).

Surrounding neighborhoods
Beallsville has three borders, including West Pike Run Township to the north and east, Deemston to the south, and North Bethlehem Township to the west.

Demographics

As of the census of 2000, there were 511 people, 196 households, and 147 families living in the borough. The population density was 210.6 people per square mile (81.2/km2). There were 216 housing units at an average density of 89.0 per square mile (34.3/km2). The racial makeup of the borough was 99.22% White and 0.78% African American.

There were 196 households, out of which 29.6% had children under the age of 18 living with them, 64.3% were married couples living together, 9.7% had a female householder with no husband present, and 25.0% were non-families. 22.4% of all households were made up of individuals, and 10.2% had someone living alone who was 65 years of age or older. The average household size was 2.61 and the average family size was 3.08.

In the borough the population was spread out, with 23.7% under the age of 18, 7.8% from 18 to 24, 25.0% from 25 to 44, 29.2% from 45 to 64, and 14.3% who were 65 years of age or older. The median age was 41 years. For every 100 females there were 94.3 males. For every 100 females age 18 and over, there were 90.2 males.

The median income for a household in the borough was $37,656, and the median income for a family was $41,667. Males had a median income of $32,250 versus $26,250 for females. The per capita income for the borough was $15,917. About 10.8% of families and 10.7% of the population were below the poverty line, including 15.9% of those under age 18 and 11.7% of those age 65 or over.

References

Boroughs in Washington County, Pennsylvania
Populated places established in 1819